The AMC Model 20 is an automotive axle manufactured by American Motors and AM General.

General specifications 
AMC 20s have an 8 7/8" ring gear and use a 29 spline axle shaft.

The AMC 20 was most often used with V8 engines in cars and Jeeps. It was also used in the AM General Humvee.

Ratios 
There were many ratios offered over the lifetime of the AMC 20. 
Letter codes were stamped on the axle to indicate installed gears. AMC changed or reused letter codes during the axle's long life.
There are other gear ratios available in the aftermarket.

Notes

Automotive engineering
American Motors
Automobile axles